Kemptown is a small community running along the King's Cliff to Black Rock in the east of Brighton, East Sussex, England.

History

The area takes its name from Thomas Read Kemp's Kemp Town residential estate of the early 19th Century, but the one-word name now refers to an area larger than the original development and is more correctly King's Cliff. Much of the housing is slightly later but still of the Regency style, although there is also Victorian architecture and some more modern buildings. Conversions of grand Regency buildings into flats and bars has provided Kemptown with some distinctive properties; one club is housed within the Sassoon Mausoleum, the former burial chamber of Edward Sassoon.

In the nineteenth century, Kemptown was home to the Brighton Institute for Deaf and Dumb Children, at 127-132 Eastern Road (now demolished), opposite Brighton College. One of its inmates was Richard Aslatt Pearce, the first deaf ordained Anglican clergyman.

Since 1950, the locality has given its name to the Brighton Kemptown parliamentary constituency, covering a wider area of eastern Brighton and at times Peacehaven.

Location and surrounding areas

Central Brighton is to the west of the area. Travelling inland (north) from Kemptown one finds Queen's Park above the western portion of Kemptown. Further to the east are the Bristol Estate, Craven Vale estate, and Whitehawk, sometimes collectively known as "East Brighton". Returning south to the seafront, Kemptown's easterly neighbours are Black Rock and then Roedean. Also within walking distance is Brighton Marina.

Community and facilities
Historically known as an actors' and artists' quarter, it has a sizeable LGBT community and a network of streets with specialised shops, hotels, cafés and pubs.

There is a space available to the community in the crypt of St. George's Church, known as The Crypt, which was built with support from a European Union urban regeneration fund.

The Royal Sussex County Hospital is located in Kemptown.

Kemptown Carnival is held each year.

Transport

Kemptown gained a railway station in 1869. The line, featuring two viaducts and a tunnel, was built at great cost partly to block the route for other railways from London. The railway lost out to bus traffic (the route from Brighton was longer than the road journey) and was closed to passenger traffic in 1933, surviving for freight until the 1970s.

There remain a number of bus services through Kemptown, and the Volk's Electric Railway passes the area along the beach.

See also
List of gay villages

References

External links
 Detailed history of Kemptown
 Detailed history of St. George's Church
 Kemptown Carnival

 

Areas of Brighton and Hove